Naif Kariri (born 16 April 1998) is a Saudi Arabian professional footballer who plays for Al-Ahli on loan from Al-Wehda.

Career
Kariri started his career at the youth teams of Hetten before joining Al-Hilal in 2014. He made his first-team debut in 2017 against Sudanese club Al-Merrikh. On 8 July 2018, Kariri and Abdulrahman Al-Yami both joined Al-Fayha on season-long loans from Al-Hilal. He ended the season making 4 appearances across all competitions. On 23 July 2019, Kariri left Al-Hilal and joined MS League side Ohod. On 28 September 2020, Kariri left Ohod and joined Al-Wehda. On 4 September 2022, Kariri joined Al-Ahli on loan.

Kariri participated in the 2017 FIFA U-20 World Cup with the Saudi Arabia U20 national team, where they were eliminated in the Round of 16.

Career statistics

Club

References

External links
 

1998 births
Living people
Association football fullbacks
Association football wingers
Saudi Arabian footballers
Saudi Arabia youth international footballers
Saudi Professional League players
Saudi First Division League players
Hetten FC players
Al Hilal SFC players
Al-Fayha FC players
Ohod Club players
Al-Wehda Club (Mecca) players
Al-Ahli Saudi FC players